Leonard Morrow (February 12, 1926– August 2, 2000) was an American professional boxer in the light heavyweight and heavyweight divisions, who was active from 1946 to 1954. He was ranked as a top contender in the light heavyweight division from 1948 to 1950. In 1948, he was the number two rated contender by the The Ring (magazine) for Freddie Mills' light heavyweight world title. During his career, he defeated hall of fame fighters, champions, and top contenders such as Archie Moore, Jimmy Bivins, Bert Lytell, and Arturo Godoy. In 1989, Archie went on record saying that Morrow was one of only three men that ever really hit him alongside Rocky Marciano and Yvon Durelle.

Amateur career
Leonard got his start in boxing under the tutelage of the former two-time welterweight champion, Young Jack Thompson. He would train under Thompson's instruction from his start in 1945 until his untimely death due to a heart attack at 41 years old in 1946. After Thompson's death, Leonard fought his last two amateur fights before making the transition into the professional ranks, winning one and losing one.

Professional career
Morrow made his professional debut on October 30, 1946, at the Auditorium in Oakland, California with a 4-round  victory over Allen Arnett. His next two bouts came against rugged veteran, Gil Mojica in March 1947. Leonard lost the first fight, which took place on March 5, via PTS in 6 rounds and subsequently lost again two weeks later via  in 2 rounds of a scheduled 4. Between April 23, 1947, and September 1, 1948, Morrow went undefeated in 15 fights, drawing one against Dee Edwards. During this unbeaten streak, he fought Mojica two more times avenging his losses with two victories PTS 6 and TKO 4 (8).

Upsetting Bert Lytell
On February 11, 1948, Morrow won a controversial 10 round split decision upset over then ranked number 2 middleweight contender and black murderer's row member Bert Lytell. In the first 6 rounds, the fight was fought fast and even until Morrow knocked down Lytell for a count of two in the sixth round. Lytell would close strong, decisively winning the last four rounds as Leonard's stamina rapidly drained, but it was only enough for one of the judges to score the fight in his favor. Bert Lytell's manager filed an immediate protest of the decision to the athletic commission, but to no avail.

California State Light Heavyweight Title
Leonard Morrow's next bout against Archie Moore would turn out to be the defining fight of his career. Despite his stunning upset win against Lytell, the 12–2–1 (6KO) prospect was thought to be over matched up against the experienced ring veteran in Archie Moore who held a record of 92–14–7 (1NC) (69KO) and the California State light heavyweight title. This bout would be Moore's first title defense of his state championship after he had out pointed Bobby Zander for the vacant title in the previous year. Scheduled for 12 rounds, on June 2, 1948, Leonard Morrow upset the odds for a second time in a row when, in the first round, after getting hit with a few clean jabs, he dropped Moore three times, winning the bout after two minutes and fifty one seconds of the opening stanza.

Morrow would not go on to defend his newly won state title in his career. After defeating Archie Moore, he knocked out Fitzie Fitzpatrick twice, before Bob Foxworth bruised and beat Morrow in 4 rounds of a scheduled 10 in September 1948. Morrow rebounded with two victories from March to April before knocking out Oakland Billy Smith in 3 rounds of a 10-round fight.

Professional boxing record

References

External links

1926 births
2000 deaths